Paulo Eduardo Ferreira Godinho (born 14 February 2002) is a Brazilian professional footballer who plays as a centre-back for Santa Clara.

Club career
Paulo Eduardo is a youth product of Anápolis before moving to Cruzeiro's youth academy in 2016. He signed his first professional contract with Cruzeiro on 3 November 2020. He made his professional debut with Cruzeiro in a 1–0 Campeonato Brasileiro Série B win over Sampaio Corrêa  on 9 January 2021. On 6 August 2022, he transferred to the Portuguese Primeira Liga club Santa Clara signing a 5-year contract.

International career
Paulo Eduardo is a youth international for Brazil, having played for the Brazil U17s in the summer of 2018.

References

External links
 

2002 births
Living people
People from Anápolis
Brazilian footballers
Brazil youth international footballers
Association football defenders
Cruzeiro Esporte Clube players
C.D. Santa Clara players
Primeira Liga players
Campeonato Brasileiro Série B players
Brazilian expatriate footballers
Brazilian expatriates in Portugal
Expatriate footballers in Portugal